FC Balkany Zorya is a professional Ukrainian football team that is based in the village of Zorya, Sarata Raion in the region of Budjak, Odesa Oblast.

History

The club was founded in 2007 as FC Zorya in the ethnically Bulgarian village of Zorya that was founded in 1831 by resettlers from Bulgaria which is located on the Balkan peninsula.

In the first year of the founding of the club managed to take second place in the championship of Sarata Raion. Between 2008–2011, Balkany became Champions of the Raion, also winning the cup and tournaments. In 2011, the team Odesa Oblast cup with the winning goal was scored by Oleksandr Raychev thereby winning the right to build a stadium in the village of Sarata. The following year began the construction of the stadium with two standard fields with grass. The ground is now named after former footballer from Zorya Boris Tropaneț as the Borys Tropanets Stadium.

In 2013, the team for the first time in its history, won the championship of Odesa Oblast Championship, and in 2014 made their debut in the Ukrainian Football Amateur League.

Two years later in 2015, became the fourth in the history of the club of Odesa region (after the FC Odesa, FC Ivan Odesa and FC Bastion Chornomorsk) to become amateur champions of Ukraine. Also the club was the runners-up in the 2015 Ukrainian Amateur Cup.

The club qualified for the domestic 2015–16 Ukrainian Cup. In the Preliminary Round, the club defeated Skala Stryi and in the next round lost 1–0 on a late goal to Ukrainian Premier League club FC Dnipro before a crowd of 10,000 spectators.

In 2016, Balkany repeated as Amateur Champions of Ukraine.

The club successfully passed attestation and will compete in the 2016–17 Ukrainian Second League season.

Current squad

Honors
Amateur Championship of Ukraine
 Winners (2): 2015, 2016

Ukrainian Amateur Cup
 Runners-up (1): 2015

 Odesa Oblast Championship
 Winners (1): 2013

 Trusevych Cup (Odesa Oblast Cup)
 Winners (2): 2014, 2015

Sarata Raion Championship
 Winners (6): 2008, 2009, 2010, 2011, 2013, 2014

Sarata Raion Cup
 Winners (4): 2008, 2010, 2011, 2012
 Governor's Cup of Odesa Oblast: 2011
 Cup Winners' Cup Odesa Oblast: 2015
 Super Cup Odesa Oblast: 2015

League and cup history

{|class="wikitable"
|-bgcolor="#efefef"
! Season
! Div.
! Pos.
! Pl.
! W
! D
! L
! GS
! GA
! P
!Domestic Cup
!colspan=2|Other
!Notes
|-bgcolor=SteelBlue
|align=center rowspan=2|2014
|align=center rowspan=2|4th
|align=center|1
|align=center|8
|align=center|4
|align=center|1
|align=center|3
|align=center|14
|align=center|9
|align=center|13
|align=center bgcolor=grey rowspan=3|
|align=center|
|align=center|
|align=center|
|-bgcolor=SteelBlue
|align=center|4
|align=center|3
|align=center|1
|align=center|0
|align=center|2
|align=center|4
|align=center|4
|align=center|3
|align=center|
|align=center|
|align=center|
|-bgcolor=SteelBlue
|align=center rowspan=2|2015
|align=center rowspan=2|4th
|align=center|1
|align=center|6
|align=center|4
|align=center|2
|align=center|0
|align=center|11
|align=center|6
|align=center|14
|align=center|
|align=center|
|align=center|
|-bgcolor=SteelBlue
|align=center bgcolor=gold|1
|align=center|10
|align=center|7
|align=center|2
|align=center|1
|align=center|14
|align=center|10
|align=center|23
|align=center rowspan=2| finals
|align=center|UAC
|align=center bgcolor=silver|Runners-up
|align=center bgcolor=gold|Champions
|-bgcolor=SteelBlue
|align=center|2016
|align=center|4th
|align=center bgcolor=gold|1
|align=center|6
|align=center|5
|align=center|0
|align=center|1
|align=center|19
|align=center|6
|align=center|15
|align=center|
|align=center|
|align=center bgcolor=gold|Champion
|-bgcolor=PowderBlue
|align=center|2016–17
|align=center|3rd
|align=center|4
|align=center|32
|align=center|16
|align=center|9
|align=center|7
|align=center|54
|align=center|32
|align=center|57
|align=center| finals
|align=center|
|align=center|
|align=center bgcolor=lightgreen|Promoted
|-bgcolor=LightCyan
|align=center|2017–18
|align=center|2nd
|align=center|11
|align=center|34  
|align=center|9 
|align=center|13 
|align=center|12  
|align=center|30
|align=center|35  
|align=center|40
|align=center| finals
|align=center|
|align=center|
|align=center|
|-bgcolor=LightCyan
|align=center|2018–19
|align=center|2nd
|align=center|8
|align=center|28
|align=center|10
|align=center|8
|align=center|10
|align=center|28
|align=center|31
|align=center|38
|align=center| finals
|align=center|
|align=center|
|align=center|
|-bgcolor=LightCyan
|align=center|2019–20
|align=center|2nd
|align=center|14
|align=center|30
|align=center|5
|align=center|10
|align=center|15
|align=center|27
|align=center|51
|align=center|25
|align=center| finals
|align=center|
|align=center|
|align=center bgcolor=pink|Relegated
|-bgcolor=PowderBlue
|align=center|2020–21
|align=center|3rd
|align=center|
|align=center|
|align=center|
|align=center|
|align=center|
|align=center|
|align=center|
|align=center|
|align=center| finals
|align=center|
|align=center|
|align=center|
|}

Managers
 2013 Andriy Parkhomenko
 2014-2015 Dmytro Holubev
 2015-2020 Andriy Parkhomenko
 2020- Denys Kolchin

References

External links
 Official Team website

 
Football clubs in Odesa Oblast
Bulgarians in Ukraine
Bulgarian association football clubs outside Bulgaria
Ukrainian Second League clubs